Jhorhat is a census town in Sankrail CD Block of Howrah Sadar subdivision in Howrah district in the Indian state of West Bengal. It is a part of Kolkata Urban Agglomeration.

Geography
It is adjacent to Andul.

Demographics
As per 2011 Census of India Jhorhat had a total population of 16,940 of which 8,655 (51%) were males and 8,285 (49%) were females. Population below 6 years was 1,444. The total number of literates in Jhorhat was 13,713 (88.49% of the population over 6 years).

Jhorhat was part of Kolkata Urban Agglomeration in 2011 census.

 India census, Jhorhat had a population of 16,123. Males constitute 54% of the population and females 46%. Jhorhat has an average literacy rate of 76%, higher than the national average of 59.5%: male literacy is 81% and female literacy is 69%. In Jhorhat, 8% of the population is under 6 years of age.

Transport
Andul railway station on Howrah-Kharagpur line is the nearest railway station.

References

Cities and towns in Howrah district
Neighbourhoods in Kolkata
Kolkata Metropolitan Area